Carib or Kari'nja is a Cariban language spoken by the Kalina people (Caribs) of South America. It is spoken by around 7,400 mostly in Brazil, The Guianas, and Venezuela. The language is currently classified as highly endangered.

Names
The language is known by several names to both its speakers and outsiders. Traditionally it has been known as "Carib" or "Carib proper" in English, after its speakers, called the "Caribs" in English. It is known Caribe in Spanish, Galina in French, and Karaïeb in Dutch. However, the speakers call themselves Kalina or Karìna (variously spelled), and call their language Karìna auran . Other variants include Kali'na, Kari'nja, Cariña, Kariña, Kalihna, Kalinya; other native names include Maraworno and Marworno.

Classification 
Kari'nja is classified as a Cariban language, in the Guianan Carib branch.

Geographic distribution 

Due to contact with Kari'nja invaders, some languages have Kari'nja words incorporated into them, despite being Arawakan languages linguistically.
A Carib-based lengua generale was once used in the old missions of the Oyapock and surrounding regions, apparently surviving at least along the Uaçá tributary into the 20th century.

In Suriname, there is a village called Konomerume which is located near the Wajambo River. With about 349 people living there, a majority identify as ethnically Kari'nja and as for who knows the language, the adults are reported to at least have a decent knowledge of it. Those above the age of 65 use the language as a primary language among the members of the community. Speakers between the ages of 45 and 65 tend to use the language only when speaking with older residents or elder members of their family, while for the most part using the official languages: Dutch and Sranan Tongo. Younger adults between the ages of 20 to 40 for the most part understand the language but do not speak it, and children learn bits about Kari'nja in school.

There is an attempt to revive Carib traditions, including the language, by some of the 500 people of Carib descent in Trinidad.

Dialects
Carib dialects (with number of speakers indicated in parentheses):
Venezuelan Carib (1000)
Guyanese Carib (2000)
Western Surinamese Carib (500)
Eastern Surinamese and French Guianese Carib (3000)
Suriname has two dialects of Kari'nja: Aretyry which is spoken in the west and central parts of the country, and Tyrewuju which is what the majority of Kari'nja speakers in Suriname use.

Alphabet
The Carib alphabet consists of 15 letters: 

a, e, i, j, k, `, m, n, o, p, r, s, t, u, w, y.

Phonology 
In the Kari'nja language, there are four syllable patterns: V, CV, VC, CVC; C standing for consonants while V means a vowel. Regarding phonemes, consonants are divided into two groups: obstruents (voiceless stops—p, t, k) and resonants (voiced stops—b, d, g, s).

Kari'nja has a typical 6 vowel system after *ô merged with *o, being a e i o u ï. Compared to past Kari'nja, the modern day Kari'nja has replaced the e in many words to o.

Allophones for /r w t/ include sounds as [ɽ β,v tʃ]. /s/ before /i/ may be pronounced as [ʃ]. /n/ before a consonant may be pronounced as [ŋ] and also [ɲ] elsewhere. Another sound, ranging [h~x], often occurs before a voiced or voiceless consonant, and succeeding a vowel, it can also be an allophone of /ʔ/.

Grammar 
There are 17 particles within Kari'nja which include the ky- prefix and the -ng suffix.

Vocabulary 
All four dialects of Kari'nja have loan words from the primary language of the area (Brazil, Suriname, Guyana, French Guiana). For example, the Kari'nja spoken in Suriname borrows words from Dutch and Sranantongo.

Examples 

Some of the words show instances in which the e has been replaced with o in present-day Kari'nja. The two statements beneath the singular words show examples of two suffixes.

References

External links

Ka'lina (Carib) Vocabulary List (from the World Loanword Database)
Surinamese Carib - English Online Dictionary
Audio resources from the MPI-PL archive for linguistic resources, which origin from data collected by dr. Berend Hoff in the period 1955-1965
 How to count in Kali’na
 A video of someone speaking Kari'nja is also available here.
 Endangered Languages Kari'nja profile
 Kari'nja main clauses vs nominalized phrases
 Formal Teaching of Kari'nja
 Carib Phonology
  The Carib Language
 ELAR archive of Kari'nja Dictionary and Video Documentation
 De'kwana (Intercontinental Dictionary Series)

Articles in class projects/Rutgers
+
Indigenous languages of the South American Northeast
Languages of French Guiana
Languages of Guyana
Languages of Suriname
Languages of Venezuela
Languages of Brazil
Languages of Trinidad and Tobago
Languages of Grenada
Indigenous languages of the Caribbean